Dillwyn may refer to the following:

Places
Dillwyn, Kansas
Dillwyn, Virginia

People with the surname
Amy Dillwyn (1845-1935), Welsh novelist
Lewis Llewelyn Dillwyn (1814-1892), Welsh industrialist and Liberal politician 
Lewis Weston Dillwyn (1778-1855), British porcelain manufacturer, naturalist and Member of Parliament

People with the name
Dillwyn Parrish (1894—1941), American writer, illustrator, and painter.
Dilly Knox born Alfred Dillwyn Knox (1884–1943) British codebreaker.
John Dillwyn Llewelyn (1810–1882) Welsh botanist and pioneering photographer.